Shevlyaginsky is a rural locality (a settlement) in Novopokrovskoye Rural Settlement, Novokhopyorsky District, Voronezh Oblast, Russia. The population was 50 as of 2010.

Geography 
Shevlyaginsky is located 37 km northwest of Novokhopyorsk (the district's administrative centre) by road. Novopokrovsky is the nearest rural locality.

References 

Populated places in Novokhopyorsky District